The arrondissement of Saint-Georges is an arrondissement of France in French Guiana department in French Guiana region. It has four communes, and was created in October 2022 from part of the arrondissement of Cayenne.

Composition

The communes of the arrondissement of Saint-Georges are:
 Camopi
 Ouanary
 Régina
 Saint-Georges

References

Saint-Georges